The Portland Police Block, located in downtown Portland, Oregon, and at the southern edge of the Old Town historic district, is listed on the National Register of Historic Places. The building served as the headquarters of the Portland Police Bureau until 1984.

See also
 National Register of Historic Places listings in South and Southwest Portland, Oregon

References

External links
 

1912 establishments in Oregon
Government buildings completed in 1912
Government buildings on the National Register of Historic Places in Oregon
National Register of Historic Places in Portland, Oregon
Police stations on the National Register of Historic Places
Portland Historic Landmarks
Portland Police Bureau
Southwest Portland, Oregon